There have been about a dozen joint Soviet-Japanese films shot since the 1960s.

{| class="wikitable"
|-
!  style="background:#b0c4de;" "width:34px; align=center"| Year
!  style="background:#b0c4de; ;"| English title
!  style="background:#b0c4de; ;"| Japanese title
!  style="background:#b0c4de; "| Russian title
!  style="background:#b0c4de; width:120px;"| Directors
!  style="background:#b0c4de;" | Studio
! style="background:#B0C4DE;" | Notes
|- valign="top"
| style="text-align:center;"| 1966 || The Little Fugitive
| 
| Маленький беглец (Malenkiy beglets)
| Eduard Bocharov  Teinosuke Kinugasa
| Gorki Film Studio  Daiei Studios
|
|- valign="top"
| style="text-align:center;"| 1974 || Moscow, My Love
| 
| Москва, любовь моя (Moskva, luybov moya)
| Alexander Mitta  Kenji Yoshida
| Toho Company  Mosfilm
|
|- valign="top"
| style="text-align:center;"| 1975 || Dersu Uzala
| 
| Дерсу Узала
| Akira Kurosawa
| Daiei Studios  Mosfilm  Atelier 41
|
|- valign="top"
| style="text-align:center;"| 1976 || Melodies of the White Night
| 
| Мелодия белой ночи (Melodiya beloy nochi)
| Kiyoshi Nishimura  Sergei Solovyov
| Toho Company  Mosfilm
|
|- valign="top"
| style="text-align:center;"| 1979 || The Way to Medals
| 
| Путь к медалям (Put k medalyam)
| Nikita Orlov  Junya Sato
| Toei Company  Mosfilm
|
|- valign="top"
| style="text-align:center;"| 1986 || {{hs|Adventures of Lolo the Penguin 1}}Adventures of Lolo the Penguin, Film 1
| 
| Приключения пингвинёнка Лоло  (Priklyucheniya pingvinyonka Lolo, Vypusk 1)
| Gennady Sokolsky  Kinjiro Yoshida
| Soyuzmultfilm
| animation
|- valign="top"
| style="text-align:center;"| 1987 || Adventures of Lolo the Penguin,  Film 3
| 
| Приключения пингвинёнка Лоло   (Priklyucheniya pingvinyonka Lolo, Vypusk 3)
| Gennady Sokolsky  Kinjiro Yoshida
| Soyuzmultfilm
| animation
|- valign="top"
| style="text-align:center;"| 1989 || A Step|
| Шаг (Shag)
|
|
|
|- valign="top"
| style="text-align:center;"| 1990 || Under the Aurora| 
| Под северным сиянием (Pod severnym siyaniyem)
| Toshio Gotō  Sergei Vronsky  Petras Abukiavicus
| Toei Company  Kobushi Productions  Ritm  Asahi Television News
|
|- valign="top"
| style="text-align:center;"| 1992 || Dreams of Russia| 
| Сны о России (Sny o Rossii)
| Junya Sato
| Toho Company  Daiei Studios
|
|-

|}

Also, during the Khrushchev Thaw, the Ten Thousand Boys'' film, "the first image of friendly  Japanese on the Soviet screen", was shot in Soviet Union under  Russian and Japanese directors, with active participations of Japanese residing in Moscow.

References

Lists of Soviet films
Japan–Soviet Union relations